Dawn of Love may refer to:
The Dawn of Love (painting), oil painting by English artist William Etty
The Dawn of Love (film), 1916 American film
Sons of Ingmar, or Dawn of Love, 1919 Swedish film